Beluj is a village and municipality in the Banská Štiavnica District, in the Banská Bystrica Region of Slovakia.

History
In 1338 it passed to the Szechényi family, in the 16th century to the Koháry family, and later on to the Coburgs.

Genealogical resources
The records for genealogical research are available at the state archive "Statny Archiv in Banska Bystrica, Slovakia"

 Roman Catholic church records (births/marriages/deaths): 1720-1908 (parish B)
 Lutheran church records (births/marriages/deaths): 1836-1927 (parish A)

See also
 List of municipalities and towns in Slovakia

External links
https://web.archive.org/web/20070513023228/http://www.statistics.sk/mosmis/eng/run.html
http://www.tourist-channel.sk/beluj/ 

Surnames of living people in Beluj

Villages and municipalities in Banská Štiavnica District